Ballashen-Pojanë is a village in Tirana County, Albania.

References

Populated places in Tirana